Gilchrist Glacier is a short channel glacier flowing to Budd Coast 9 nautical miles (17 km) northwest of Fox Glacier. Delineated by G.D. Blodgett (1955) from aerial photographs taken by U.S. Navy Operation Highjump (1946–47).  Named by Advisory Committee on Antarctic Names (US-ACAN) after Edward Gilchrist, Acting Surgeon on the sloop Wilkes.

See also
 List of glaciers in the Antarctic
 Glaciology

References

Glaciers of Wilkes Land